The Zongshen 250 GS, introduced in 2006, is a lightweight single-cylinder air-cooled motorcycle. 
Unlike its predecessor the Zongshen 200 GS, the 250 GS incorporates an OHC engine configuration. 
The ZS250GS is exported to countries around the world, including the United States, Australia, the Philippines, and South Africa.

Specifications
The specifications are as follows:

 Engine: 4-stroke, single-cylinder
 Displacement: 230cc
 Engine cooling: air-cooled
 Power: 13kW / 7,500 rpm
 Max torque: 16.5Nm /6,000 rpm
 Starter: electric start
 Max load: 150 kg
 Ignition: CDI
 Petrol consumption: 2.4L/100 km (specifics unknown)
 Ground clearance: 145 mm
 Axle base: 1385 mm
 Brakes front: disc
 Brakes rear: disc
 Front & rear suspension: hydraulic spring
 Front wheel: 110/70x17"
 Rear wheel: 140/70x17"
 Fuel tank capacity: 20.0L
 NW: 166 kg
 Dimensions (LxWxH): 2015x765x1095 mm

External links

 Zongshen homepage
 Zongshen America website
 Xplorers Philippines website

Motorcycles introduced in 2006
250 GS